Separate or separates may refer to:
Soil separates, three kinds of soil mineral particles: sand, silt, and clay
Separate (song), 2016 song by South African songstress Amanda Black
Separates (clothing), Mix-and-match separates, clothing 
Separates (album), 1978 album by 999
Separate Baptists, an 18th-century group of Baptists in the United States
Separate Baptists in Christ, a denomination of Separate Baptists found mostly in United States
Separate Tables, a play by Terence Rattigan

See also 
Separation (disambiguation)